Events from the year 1660 in Sweden

Incumbents
 Monarch - Charles X Gustav then Charles XI

Events

 13 February - Charles XI of Sweden succeed Charles X of Sweden under a regency headed by his mother Queen Dowager Hedvig Eleonora.
 27 May - Treaty of Copenhagen (1660)
 Former Queen Christina visit Sweden and unsuccessfully claims the throne.

Births

 5 March - Olof Rudbeck the Younger, explorer, scientist  (died 1740) 
 Simon Affleck, tax official born in Estonia. 
 Hedvig Eleonora Klingenstierna, first woman to hold a lecture at a Swedish university.

Deaths

References

External links

 
Years of the 17th century in Sweden
Sweden